Leavenworth is an unincorporated community located in Leavenworth Township in Brown County, Minnesota, United States. The elevation is 1,004 feet. It was situated on two locations in Brown County, one before the Dakota War of 1862 (section 14 of the township, near Cottonwood River), and in section 27 of the township along the Cottonwood River after the war.

History
Mississippi Indians (Chocktaw) migrated from the south to the Leavenworth area, settling near bodies of water where there were fish and water. River banks and the areas around lakes provided timber that was used for fuel. Later, when people began to homestead on area lands, they settled along the banks of the Cottonwood River.

Located along the Shetek Trail, an east-west wagon trail, Leavenworth was organized on April 16, 1857 and platted that year in section 14. It was probably named for Colonel Henry Leavenworth, a commander who in 1819 established the fort now called Fort Snelling. John B. Calkins' log cabin was built about 1857, and the following year he became the postmaster at Leavenworth.

Settlers were killed or left the original Leavenworth location (section 14) as the result of the Dakota War of 1862, during which the Joseph Brown family were killed in Leavenworth Township on the Shetek Trail in August 1862 by the Dakota people. A historic marker about the Brown family's experience during the war exists about one mile west of the current Leavenworth location.

Later, settlers established a second Leavenworth, Minnesota in section 27. The settlement, established on the land owned by Rose and George and Windschitl, was located along the Big Cottonwood River. The settlers established businesses, including a general store, blacksmith shop, school, flour mill, sawmill, druggist, and physician. A church was established in the 1860s, the Church of the Japanese Martyrs. A historic marker was established in Leavenworth on County Road 24, .1 miles east of County Road 8 to provide historical information about the settlement.

In the 1870s, a railroad line was established that bypassed the Leavenworth community. The population of the town dwindled until the only commercial buildings in the mid-1880s were a mill and saloon. After periods where the post office was closed, it finally closed in 1902. Leavenworth failed to thrive in the late 19th century and early 20th century, but there were two stores, the Mathiowetz shop, a rectory, the Japanese Martyrs Church, a schoolhouse, and a cemetery in the 1930s and 1940s. A convent and a new school opened there in 1953.

References

External links
HomeTownLocator Map of Leavenworth, Minnesota
Historic Leavensworth Township Map, with sections

Unincorporated communities in Brown County, Minnesota
Unincorporated communities in Minnesota
1857 establishments in Minnesota Territory
Populated places established in 1857